I Love Sarah Jane is a 2008 Australian zombie horror short film directed by Spencer Susser and written by David Michôd and Spencer Susser. The film had its world premiere  at the Sundance Film Festival on 15 January 2008.

In 2011, the short was reported to be under development to be turned into a feature film.

Plot 
Jimbo is 13 and can think of only one girl—Sarah Jane. And no matter what stands in his way-bullies, violence, chaos, or zombies-nothing will stop him from finding a way into her world.

Cast
Brad Ashby as Jimbo
Mia Wasikowska as Sarah Jane
Vladimir Matovic as Joey
Beau South as Rory
Peter Yacoub as Gram
Richard Mueck as Zombie
Anton Enus as Newsreader

Reception

Critical response
The film earned mainly positive reviews from critics. MarBelle of short of the week gave film the positive review said "The thing about ILSJ—co-written by Susser and David Michôd—is that if you were to strip away the high production values and outlandish world setting, there’d still be at its core a touching age-old story of teen awkwardness in relating to the object of your desire that places our hero Jimbo in the shoes of Kevin Arnold or Dawn Wiener before him, it’s just that their obstacles were slightly less brain hungry." Amber Wilkinson of Eye For Film gave the film four out of five stars and said "With so many zombie features and, indeed, zombie shorts around, it's hard to make something that feels new, but by mixing up the trappings of a naturalistic coming of age drama with the horror, this short takes a different tack, breathing life and spirit into the undead." Wesley Morris of Boston.com said that "Australian suburb where some parentless neighborhood kids torture a zombie. You wait for several minutes for the title to explain itself, which, in its sweet, jokey finale, it does."

Awards and official selections
 Official Selection - Sundance film festival 
 Official Selection - Melbourne International Film Festival
 Official Selection - Clermont-Ferrand International Short Film Festival
 Official Selection - Puchon International Fantastic Film Festival 
 Official Selection - Cannes Film Festival
 Official Selection - Seattle International Film Festival
 Official Selection - Sydney Film Festival
 Official Selection - Nashville Film Festival
 Official Selection - Arizona International Film Festival
 Official Selection - London Film Festival
 Official Selection - Telluride Film Festival
 Official Selection - Edinburgh International Film Festival
 Official Selection - Los Angeles Film Festival
 Included in Wholphin 10

See also
 Cinema of Australia

References

External links 
 
 

2008 films
2008 horror films
2008 independent films
2000s science fiction horror films
2008 short films
Australian independent films
Australian short films
Australian post-apocalyptic films
Zombie short films
2000s English-language films
Films directed by Spencer Susser